Atukorale or Athukorala or Athukorale is a Sinhalese surname.

Notable people
 Amarakeerthi Athukorala, Sri Lankan politician
 Gamini Atukorale (1952–2002), Sri Lankan politician
 Henry Athukorale (1930–2009), Ceylonese army officer
 Kapila Athukorala, Sri Lankan politician
 Thalatha Atukorale (born 1963), Sri Lankan politician

See also
 
 
 

Sinhalese surnames